Vertigo ultimathule is a species of minute, air-breathing land snail, terrestrial pulmonate gastropod molluscs or micromollusks in the family Vertiginidae, the whorl snails.

Distribution 

Vertigo ultimathule is found in:
 Finnmark County in the river valleys of the River Tana and its tributary Anarjohka, Norway
 Pältsan, the very northernmost part of Sweden,

The type locality is Pältsan-area, in the northernmost corner of Swedish Lapland.

Occurrences are to be expected in other parts of Finnmark and adjacent parts of Finland and Sweden. It appears that Vertigo ultimathule is rare with a very limited distribution endemic to northernmost Norway and Sweden.

Description 

Vertigo ultimathule is a medium-sized Vertigo, which reaches a height of 2.1–2.2 mm and a diameter of 1.3–1.4 mm, the number of whorls is 4.6–4.7. The shell is almost cylindrical, with marked convex whorls, which are separated by a marked, deep suture. The shape is not distinctly ovoid, as in some other Vertigo-species, and the
last whorl does not narrow markedly at the base. In side view from left the outer margin of the last whorl forms a blunt angle close to the umbilicus. The aperture is completely toothless or with only a small, delicate, rather deeply set parietal denticle. The mouth-edge is simple and scarcely thickened. The colour of the shell is light yellow – dark yellow-brown. The surface is glossy, with marked, but irregular, rather coarse striation.

Ecology 
The localities of Vertigo ultimathule are brook valleys or mountain slopes with mountain birch and often Salix shrubs. The pH of the ground litter was measured in two of the localities, the values
obtained were 6.75 and 6.0. The Norwegian localities are situated at 180–200 m altitude; the Swedish somewhat higher, at 520–620 m altitude.

References
This article incorporates CC-BY-3.0 text from the reference

 Bank, R. A.; Neubert, E. (2017). Checklist of the land and freshwater Gastropoda of Europe. Last update: July 16th, 2017

Further reading 
 von Proschwitz T. (2008). "Faunistical news from the Göteborg Natural History Museum 2007 – snails, slugs and mussels – with some notes on Vertigo ultimathule von Proschwitz – a landsnail species from northernmost Sweden new to science". Göteborgs Naturhistoriska Museum, Årstryck 2008: 51-72.

External links

ultimathule
Gastropods described in 2007